Shadows of the Summertime is the third studio album recorded by John Ralston. Recorded over two separate weeks in New Orleans at Listen Up! Studios.

Track listing
 Bedroom Walls (2:44)
 Solitude and Vine (3:44)
 This Summer (3:29)
 Love Will Come Around (2:47)
 Shadows of the Summertime (3:04)
 Pretty Little Heart (3:10)
 Robert's Bar (3:36)
 Gas & Matches (2:36)
 Oh Lord (3:11)
 Higher Road (2:54)

John Ralston (musician) albums
2011 albums